The Milwaukee Road S3 Class was a class of 10 4-8-4 "Northern" type steam locomotives built by the American Locomotive Company in 1944 and operated by the Milwaukee Road until the mid 1950s. The locomotives saw service in pulling freight and passenger trains throughout the Milwaukee Road.

Today, two S3s survive, No. 261 is in operating condition and No. 265 is on display in Union, Illinois.

History
The Milwaukee Road had acquired its first four-unit EMD FT diesel set in October 1941. It had managed to get a second in July 1943, but when it wanted more in 1944, it was only allocated six by the War Production Board. Instead, it was allocated ten Alco 4-8-4 locomotives. These were delivered in July and September 1944, and were classified as class S3 by the Milwaukee Road.

Design
Alco had drafted a compromise design, as the WPB has placed a moratorium on creating completely new designs. It was based on the frame of the Chicago, Rock Island and Pacific Railroad class R67B, mated to the boiler of the Delaware and Hudson Railway class K. The tender was a water-bottom type with a pair of six-wheel trucks. They were also fitted with an air horn.

They were connected to the  diameter driving wheels by Walschaerts valve gear.

While they were smaller and less powerful than the Milwaukee's earlier class S2, they were comparable to road's first class of 4-8-4, the class S1 and were equipped with roller bearings.

Construction
All ten were built by Alco's Schenectady plant in July (7) and September 1944 (3). Alco assigned order number S-1928 and serial numbers 71973 through 71982.

Service
Initially they were used as freight locomotives, and only used on lines east of the electrified zone, being allocated to the Dubuque and Illinois Division. As a consequence of the Korean War, additional locomotives were needed on the Idaho Division, so four locomotives (262, 263, 267 and 269) were converted to oil firing and sent west to work passenger and freight trains in the gap between the two electrified zones.

By March 1954, No. 260 had been transferred to the La Crosse and River Division, and 261 was on the Milwaukee Division; the other four coal-burners were still on the D&I Division, and the four oil-burners on the Idaho Division.

By December 1954, however, the Milwaukee was effectively dieselised. As the equipment trusts on the ten locomotives had yet to expire, they could not be scrapped or sold, so they were placed into storage – the Idaho four going to Tacoma.

Preservation

Two S3s survived into preservation:

Milwaukee Road 261 was retired in August 1956 and donated to the National Railroad Museum in Green Bay, Wisconsin in 1958. Today, the locomotive is owned, operated, and maintained by Minneapolis-based nonprofit organization Friends of the 261, which runs occasional and seasonal excursion trains using the locomotive.
Milwaukee Road 265 was retired in September 1956 and donated to the city of Milwaukee, Wisconsin and sat the on display until 1975. The locomotive was then moved to the Illinois Railway Museum in Union, Illinois where it currently resides.

References

 
 
 
 
 

S3
ALCO locomotives
4-8-4 locomotives
Preserved steam locomotives of the United States
Railway locomotives introduced in 1944
Standard gauge locomotives of the United States
Passenger locomotives
Freight locomotives